Harpalus lewisii is a species of ground beetle in the subfamily Harpalinae. It was described by John Lawrence LeConte in 1865.

References

lewisii
Beetles described in 1865